Carolyne Alexandra Morrison (February 18, 1905 – August 24, 1997) was a politician in Manitoba, Canada.  She was a Progressive Conservative member of the Legislative Assembly of Manitoba from 1960 to 1969.

Born in Ridgeville, Manitoba in 1905, Morrison was educated at Emerson, Manitoba, and did teacher training in Brandon.  She was a teacher and homemaker prior to her entry into politics.  In 1938, she married Hugh Morrison, who was a member of the Manitoba Assembly from 1936 to 1957. She ran for election in the same constituency following the death of Maurice Ridley.

She was first elected to the legislature in a by-election on December 9, 1960, winning easy election in the rural, southern riding of Pembina.  In the 1962 election, she defeated Liberal Charles Cousins by 211 votes.  She won a greater margin victory in the 1966 election, and did not run in 1969.  Morrison was never appointed to cabinet.

She was one of only two women in the Manitoba legislature during the 1960s (the other being fellow Progressive Conservative Thelma Forbes), and only the fifth woman ever elected to the legislature.

Morrison also served in the local Red Cross and on the Manitou Hospital Board; she was a news correspondent for the local district for the Western Canadian newspaper.

She died in Manitou at age 92, after suffering from Alzheimer's in her old age.

References 

1905 births
1997 deaths
Progressive Conservative Party of Manitoba MLAs
Women MLAs in Manitoba
People from Emerson, Manitoba
20th-century Canadian women politicians